Lisa Eldridge (born 26 October 1974 in Auckland, New Zealand) is an English-New Zealand make-up artist, businesswoman, author, and YouTuber. She was raised in New Zealand and then moved to Liverpool, where she settled with her family. Her professional career began when she was booked by Elle magazine to work with model Cindy Crawford. From 2003 to 2013, Eldridge was the Creative Director for Boots No7, where she was responsible for developing, re-designing, and re-launching the brand. Eldridge is currently the global creative director of Lancôme, working across product development, advertising campaigns, and digital strategy. In October 2015, she published her first book Face Paint: The Story of Makeup.

Early life
Born in New Zealand, Eldridge later moved to the UK and settled with her family in Liverpool. She gained interest in cosmetics at age six, when she discovered a box of her mother's vintage Mary Quant and Coty make up from the 1960s at her grandmother's house. Her interest deepened when she was given a book on theatrical stage make up as a teenager, and it was then that she decided to pursue a career in make up artistry.

Career

After moving to London, Eldridge took a course in photographic make up artistry at Complexions while working on the Lancôme counter at Harrods to gain first-hand experience. She then began building her portfolio, and eventually she signed up with a make up agency. In the early stages of her career, Elle magazine hired Eldridge to work with model Cindy Crawford, which led to the pair working together on several more shoots. Eldridge has been based in Paris, New York and, Los Angeles, and now resides full-time in London. Her work has appeared on the pages, covers, and celebrity shoots of British, Italian, French, Chinese, and Japanese Vogue, as well as Love, Allure, Glamour, Elle, Numéro, Harper's Bazaar, Pop, i-D and, Lula. Throughout her career Eldridge has worked with a range of world famous photographers, including Tim Walker, Mert and Marcus, Regan Cameron, Sølve Sundsbø, Rankin, Paolo Roversi, David Sims, Mario Testino, and Patrick Demarchelier. She has also collaborated with fashion houses and beauty brands on their international advertising campaigns and runway shows. These include Lancôme, Chloé, Alberta Ferretti, Prada, Donna Karan, Moschino, Yohji Yamamoto, and Pucci.

In 2013 she was named by The Business of Fashion as one of the people 'Shaping the Global Fashion Industry' in their annual Fashion 500 list. Since 6 January 2015 she has been the Make-up Creative Director of Lancôme. In October 2015, she published the book Face Paint: The Story of Makeup, focused on the extensive history of makeup.

Television and media

Eldridge has been the resident on-screen beauty expert for the Channel 4 TV series Ten Years Younger, as well as an expert on non-invasive treatments on Ten Years Younger – The Challenge.

She has made numerous UK television appearances on GMTV and Lorraine, and has also appeared on the Today Show in the USA.

In 2021 Eldridge hosted Makeup: A Glamorous History, a show about the history of makeup on BBC Two.

Online and social media 
In February 2010, Eldridge launched her website of make-up tutorials, beauty advice, and insider knowledge.

Brand collaborations

From 2003 to 2013, Eldridge was Creative Director for Boots No7, where she was responsible for developing, re-designing, and re-launching the brand. Since June 2011, she has worked with Chanel to create videos for their site, Chanel.com. Eldridge is now the Global Creative Director of Lancôme.

References

External links

Living people
British make-up artists
British cosmetics businesspeople
British YouTubers
People from Auckland
1974 births